Penntown is an unincorporated community in Adams Township, Ripley County, in the U.S. state of Indiana.

History
Penntown was originally called Pennsylvaniaburg, and under the latter name was laid out in 1837. The community was named after Pennsylvania, the native state of a share of the early settlers.

Geography

References

Unincorporated communities in Ripley County, Indiana
Unincorporated communities in Indiana